Centennial Park is a Howard County Department of Recreation & Parks' public park located in Ellicott City, Maryland. It surrounds Centennial Lake, covering an area of 337 acres.

Traveling around the lake is a 2.4-mile paved trail loop. Boat rentals are available during certain months of the year, and a boat ramp is available to the public. Fishing is permitted in the lake, but hunting, firearms, swimming, sailboarding, wind surfing, stand up paddleboarding, and inner tubing are all prohibited.  Pets are permitted in the park except for in picnic pavilions, playgrounds, and sports areas. According to Howard County law, pet owners are required to clean up any and all waste their pets produce. In order to keep the park clean, plastic bag dispensers are located around the park.  The Howard County leash law is enforced. 

The lake, field, wooded areas and wetlands that make up Centennial Park are home to abundant wildlife. A buoy line restricts access to a portion of the lake reserved as a Wildlife Area, providing a safe spawning area for fish and nesting sites for birds.

The loop around the lake is suitable for running, walking, and biking. There are several benches along the loop and pavilions located nearby. There are also water fountains for public convenience, including water fountains for dogs. The first water fountain for dogs was recently added as part of the Water Fountain Donation Program. The fountain was donated in 2017 by the O'Brien family in remembrance of their family dog, Phoenix. The fountain also includes a bottle filler station, in compliance with the program's initiative to reduce the use of plastic water bottles.

There are four areas of Centennial Park, each with its own entrance:

10000 Route 108 (Main/South), Ellicott City, MD 21042

4800 Woodland Road (East), Ellicott City, MD 21042

4651 Centennial Lane (West), Ellicott City, MD 21042

9801 Old Annapolis Road (North), Ellicott City, MD 21042

References

Howard County Government. (n.d.). Water Fountain Donation Program. Retrieved from https://www.howardcountymd.gov/waterfountain.

Ellicott City, Maryland